Tema Central is one of the constituencies represented in the Parliament of Ghana. It elects one Member of Parliament (MP) by the first past the post system of election. The Tema Central constituency is located in the Greater Accra Region of Ghana. Kofi Brako is a member of parliament for the constituency. He was elected on the ticket of the New Patriotic Party (Ghana)|New Patriotic Party (NPP) and won a majority of 28,334 votes to become the MP.

Boundaries 
The constituency is located within the Greater Accra Region of Ghana and part of the Tema municipality.

See also 

 List of Ghana Parliament constituencies
 List of political parties in Ghana

References 

Parliamentary constituencies in the Greater Accra Region